Sakarya is an electoral district of the Grand National Assembly of Turkey. It elects 7 members of parliament (deputies) to represent the province of the same name for a four-year term by the D'Hondt method, a party-list proportional representation system.

Members 
Population reviews of each electoral district are conducted before each general election, which can lead to certain districts being granted a smaller or greater number of parliamentary seats. The number of seats allocated to Sakarya fluctuated between six and seven seats in the last twenty years; most recently it rose to seven seats.

General elections

2011

June 2015

November 2015

2018

Presidential elections

2014

References 

Electoral districts of Turkey
Politics of Sakarya Province